The election for the President of the Fourth Legislative Council took place on 8 October 2008 for members of the 4th Legislative Council of Hong Kong to among themselves elect the President of the Legislative Council of Hong Kong for the duration of the Council.

Proceedings 

According to Article 71 of the Hong Kong Basic Law and Rule 4 of the Rules of Procedure of the Legislative Council, the President of the Legislative Council has to be a Chinese citizen of 40 years old or above, a permanent resident of Hong Kong with no right of abode in any foreign country, and has ordinarily resided in Hong Kong for not less than 20 years continuously.

Albert Ho, as the most senior member of the parliament, presided over the special forum on 6 October, which allowed candidates to present their manifesto and answer questions from other members, and the election. Before the voting began, Leung Kwok-hung and Chan Wai-yip, the two radical democrats, questioned if Tsang was a member of the Chinese Communist Party, but Ho insisted no Q&A for the voting session. Tsang, after election, also declined to comment.

Candidates

Results
This election marks the first time in Hong Kong's history the presidency is occupied by a party member, as the predecessors are all independents or nonpartisans, despite they might lean towards political camps. Tsang thanked the colleagues' support and vowed to do his best. He also resigned as the member of the Executive Council to avoid role conflict.

As Li received 24 votes against 23 democrats, a member of the pro-Beijing camp voted for the rivalry Li from the pan-democracy camp in the secret ballot. However, it was also unknown whether all 23 democrats voted for Li.

References 

Legislative Council of Hong Kong
 
2008 Hong Kong legislative election
2008 elections in China
October 2008 events in China
2008 in Hong Kong
President of the Hong Kong Legislative Council elections